Daria Gavrilova was the defending champion, but chose not to participate.

Han Xinyun won the title, defeating Alla Kudryavtseva in the final 6–1, 6–1.

Seeds

Main draw

Finals

Top half

Bottom half

References 
 Main draw

Launceston Tennis International - Singles